The Chairman of the BBC is the head of the BBC Board, responsible for maintaining the independence of the BBC and overseeing the functioning of the BBC to fulfil its mission. The chairman leads the process for appointing the Director-General and can dismiss the Director-General. The chairman of the BBC also acts as the corporation's most senior representative to Parliament and the government, including the devolved administrations.

The chairman is formally appointed by the King-in-Council, on the advice of the Secretary of State for a four-year term. The current chairman is Richard Sharp, who succeeded Sir David Clementi in February 2021.

List of chairmen
Status

See also
 BBC Charter

References

External links
BBC Chairmen